The Canary Wharf Squash Classic 2015 is the 2015 Canary Wharf Squash Classic, which is a tournament of the PSA World Tour event International (Prize money : 50 000 $). The event took place at the East Wintergarden in London in England from 23 March to 27 March. Nick Matthew won his fifth Canary Wharf Squash Classic trophy, beating Simon Rösner in the final.

Prize money and ranking points
For 2015, the prize purse was $50,000. The prize money and points breakdown is as follows:

Seeds

Draw and results

See also
2015 PSA World Tour
Canary Wharf Squash Classic
2015 Men's British Open

References

External links
PSA Canary Wharf Squash Classic 2014 website
Canary Wharf Squash Classic 2015 official website

Canary Wharf
Canary Wharf Squash Classic
Canary Wharf Squash Classic
Canary Wharf Squash Classic
Canary Wharf Squash Classic
Squash competitions in London